Sam Akoitai, born 5 May 1961 in Bougainville, was a Papua New Guinean politician, a member of the United Resources Party.

Akoitai joined the Bougainville Copper Limited company in 1978, and worked there for eight years. In 1990, he became involved in the Bougainvillean civil war, leading a resistance movement against the Bougainville Revolutionary Army (BRA), and subsequently participated in the ensuing peace process. During the war, he was abducted by the BRA, and several members of his family were murdered. He initiated peace talks with the BRA in 1994.

In 1997, Akoitai took part in the Papua New Guinean general election, and was elected Member of Parliament for Central Bougainville. He was appointed Minister for Bougainville Affairs in the government of Prime Minister Bill Skate. In 1999, he was appointed to the State Ministry. He lost his position in government when Skate lost office to Mekere Morauta later that year.

In the 2002 general reelection, Akoitai retained his parliamentary seat, and was appointed Minister responsible for Mining, Environment, Conservation and Correctional Institution Services by Prime Minister Michael Somare.

In 2008, no longer a member of the national government, he took part in the Bougainvillean presidential election, and finished second out of fourteen candidates, defeated by James Tanis.

Akoitai died on 17 December 2021.

References

1961 births
2021 deaths
People from the Autonomous Region of Bougainville
Members of the National Parliament of Papua New Guinea
United Resources Party politicians
Bougainvillean activists
20th-century Papua New Guinean politicians
21st-century Papua New Guinean politicians